

Group A

Australia
Head coach: Frank Farina

France
Head coach: Roger Lemerre

Mexico
Head coach: Enrique Meza

South Korea
Head coach:  Guus Hiddink

Group B

Brazil
Head coach: Émerson Leão

Cameroon
Head coach:  Pierre Lechantre

Canada
Head coach:  Holger Osieck

Japan
Head coach:  Philippe Troussier

External links
FIFA.com

FIFA Confederations Cup squads
Squads